Centre Meeting and Schoolhouse, also known as Centre Meeting of Religious Society of Friends, is a historic Quaker meeting house and school located on Center Meeting Road in Centerville, New Castle County, Delaware. It was built in 1796 and is rectangular brick building with pitched roof and brick chimney at either end. Sheds are attached to the east and west sides.  The school house was built by the Friends for their children and those of the community. It is square with a pitched roof and a lunette in the gable toward the west.

It was added to the National Register of Historic Places in 1971.

References

External links

Website

Quaker meeting houses in Delaware
Churches on the National Register of Historic Places in Delaware
Churches completed in 1796
18th-century Quaker meeting houses
Churches in New Castle County, Delaware
Historic American Buildings Survey in Delaware
National Register of Historic Places in New Castle County, Delaware
School buildings on the National Register of Historic Places in Delaware
1796 establishments in the United States